Paul Foulquié (16 March 1893 – 6 September 1983) was a French thinker and philosopher known for his books on metaphysics, epistemology, existentialism and psychology.
His works have been translated into different languages.

Bibliography
 L'existentialisme (1947. Engl., Existentialism, 1948)
 Precis de philosophie (1948)
 La volonté (1972)
 La dialectique (1953)
 La psychologie contemporaine (1951)
 Psychologie (1952)
 Dictionnaire de la langue philosophique by Foulquié Paul (1986)
 Diccionario de Pedogogia (1976)
 Dictionnaire de la langue pédagogique (French Edition) by Paul Foulquié and Quadrige (1997)
 Précis de philosophie Tome III Métaphysique (1955)
 l'action. Cours de philosophie (1961)
 Alain (French Edition) (1965)
 Précis de philosophie à l'usage des candidats au baccalauréat tome 2: Logique-morale métaphysique (1952)
 Précis de philosophie à l'usage des candidats au baccalauréat Tome 1 Psychologie (1936)
 La Republique, Livre VII (1965)
 La psychologie contemporaine (1951)

References

Existentialists
20th-century French philosophers
Metaphysicians
Continental philosophers
1893 births
1983 deaths
French male non-fiction writers
20th-century French male writers